Javon may refer to:

Notable people with the given name "Javon"

Javon Bess (born 1996), American basketball player
Javon East (born 1995), Jamaican footballer
Javon Francis (born 1994), Jamaican sprinter
Javon Freeman-Liberty (born 1999), American basketball player
Javon Hagan (born 1997), American football player
Javon Hargrave (born 1993), American football player
Javon Jackson (born 1965), American saxophonist
Javon Kinlaw (born 1997), American football player
Javon Leake (born 1998), American football player
Javon McCrea (born 1992), American basketball player
Javon McKinley (born 1998), American football player
Javon Patterson (born 1997), American football player
Javon Ringer (born 1987), American football player
Javon Rolland-Jones (born 1994), American football player
Javon Searles (born 1986), Barbadian cricketer
Javon Walker (born 1978), American football player
Javon Walton (born 2006), American child actor
Javon Wims (born 1994), American football player

See also
Folco de Baroncelli-Javon (1869–1943), French writer and cattle farmer
Jevon, people with the given name "Jevon"
Javan (disambiguation), a disambiguation page for "Javan"
Jovan (given name), people with the given name "Jovan"
Joven (disambiguation), a disambiguation page for "Joven"